The name Nana has been used for three tropical cyclones in the Atlantic Ocean.

Hurricane Nana (1990) – a Category 1 hurricane that never threatened land. 
Tropical Storm Nana (2008) – short-lived weak tropical storm that remained at sea.
Hurricane Nana (2020) – a Category 1 hurricane that made landfall in Belize, earliest fourteenth named storm on record.

Atlantic hurricane set index articles